Anne Edwards (born 1927) is an American author.

Anne Edwards may also refer to:

Anne Edwards (politician) (born 1935), Canadian politician
Anne Edwards (botanist), British plant scientist
Anne M. Edwards, screenwriter of Minor Details
Mihi Edwards (1918–2008), New Zealand writer, social worker, teacher and kaumātua (respected Māori elder), known as Anne Edwards until the 1960s

See also
Annie Edwards ( 1830–1896), English novelist
Anna Edwards (disambiguation)
Edwards (surname)